Nickey Chevrolet (also referred to as "Nickey Chicago") was a Chevrolet automobile dealership located in Chicago, Illinois, USA. Founded in 1925 by brothers E.J. and Jack Stephani, Nickey Chevrolet became one of the largest factory dealerships, specializing in high performance muscle car sales and service.

Nickey Chevrolet was originally established in the 1920s at 4120 Irving Park Road (at the corner of Kedvale and Irving Park Road). When the Northwest Expressway (completed on 5 November 1960 and later renamed the Kennedy Expressway) was constructed, Nickey Chevrolet moved to 4501 W. Irving Park Road in Chicago. Ultimately, Nickey Chevrolet grew to a  facility.

The service department specialized in engine swaps, transplanting 427 cubic inch displacement (CID) "Big Block" Chevy engines into the very first 1967 Camaros, and soon thereafter into Novas, Chevelles, Impalas and even Corvettes. Nickey Chevrolet modified hundreds of cars to their customers’ specifications. A customer could walk into the dealership, pick out a car, and then have it modified to their taste.  Because of their rarity, many of these dealer-modified cars are maintained in museums or private collections and are rarely seen in public.

The dealership was sold in 1973 and became Keystone Chevrolet. The key players who built Nickey's performance cars and image moved to a new location on Milwaukee Avenue in Chicago. The New Speed Shop and Automobile Conversion Centre was named "Nickey Chicago". They continued to build legendary Hi-Performance Chevys until 1977 when the speed/performance shop finally closed its doors.

In 2002 a muscle car collector and enthusiast, Stefano Bimbi, purchased the legal rights and trademarks for the Nickey brand. The new company, Nickey Performance, located in Saint Charles, Illinois, builds, sells and services vehicles branded as Nickey Super Cars, and has also taken steps to establish a registry for Nickey-modified cars.

References

External links
Landmark Dodge Website

Auto dealerships of the United States
Automotive motorsports and performance companies
American companies established in 1925
Retail companies established in 1925
Retail companies disestablished in 1973
Muscle cars
Chevrolet
Defunct companies based in Chicago